Bosanci may refer to:

 Bosanci, Suceava, a commune in Suceava County, Romania
 Bosanci, Croatia, a village near Bosiljevo, Croatia

See also
 Bosanac (singular form)
 Bosnians